Kovačevski is a Macedonian surname. Notable people with the surname include:

 Slobodan Kovačevski, a Macedonian politician
  (1943–2006), a Macedonian writer

See also
 Kovachevski (Ковачевски), surname
 Kovač (surname)
 Kovačec, surname
 Kovaček, surname
 Kovačev, surname
 Kováčik, surname
 Kovačić, surname
 Kovačina (surname)
 Kovačevik, surname
 Kovačević, surname

Macedonian-language surnames